Risk-based testing (RBT) is a type of software testing that functions as an organizational principle used to prioritize the tests of features and functions in software, based on the risk of failure, the function of their importance and likelihood or impact of failure.</ref> In theory, there are an infinite number of possible tests. Risk-based testing uses risk (re-)assessments to steer all phases of the test process, i.e., test planning, test design, test implementation, test execution and test evaluation. This includes for instance, ranking of tests, and subtests, for functionality; test techniques such as boundary-value analysis, all-pairs testing and state transition tables aim to find the areas most likely to be defective.

Assessing risks 

Comparing the changes between two releases or versions is key in order to assess risk.
Evaluating critical business modules is a first step in prioritizing tests, but it does not include the notion of evolutionary risk. This is then expanded using two methods: change-based testing and regression testing.
 Change-based testing allows test teams to assess changes made in a release and then prioritize tests towards modified modules.
 Regression testing ensures that a change, such as a bug fix, did not introduce new faults into the software under test. One of the main reasons for regression testing is to determine whether a change in one part of the software has any effect on other parts of the software.

These two methods permit test teams to prioritize tests based on risk, change, and criticality of business modules. Certain technologies can make this kind of test strategy very easy to set up and to maintain with software changes.

Types of risk 

Risk can be identified as the probability that an undetected software bug may have a negative impact on the user of a system.

The methods assess risks along a variety of dimensions:

Business or operational 
 High use of a subsystem, function or feature
 Criticality of a subsystem, function or feature, including the cost of failure

Technical 
 Geographic distribution of development team
 Complexity of a subsystem or function

External 
 Sponsor or executive preference
 Regulatory requirements

E-business failure-mode related 
 Static content defects
 Web page integration defects
 Functional behavior-related failure
 Service (Availability and Performance) related failure
 Usability and Accessibility-related failure
 Security vulnerability
 Large scale integration failure

Some considerations about prioritizing risks is written by Venkat Ramakrishnan in a blog.

References

Software testing